Mary Gillen Montgomery High School is a high school in Semmes, Mobile County, Alabama, United States. Founded in 1965, the school is part of the Mobile County Public School System and is one of the largest of the county's 18 public high schools. The school is known as "MGM," "Mary G," "Mary Montgomery," or "Montgomery High".

The school serves: Semmes and the community of Wilmer, the latter formerly an incorporated municipality.

Enrollment
MGM draws its students primarily from Semmes Middle School, which is one of the largest middle schools in the state of Alabama. The school serves grades 9-12.

History
MGM is named after Mary Gillen Montgomery.  She was a student, teacher, and administrator in the Mobile County Public School System for 51 years. She was associated with MGM for 39 years.

Facilities
The campus spans a  tract bordering US Highway 98 and Snow Road in west Mobile County, Alabama (Lat. 30.7811° N, Long. 88.2775° W). Facilities include a large football stadium, baseball stadium, gymnasium, field house/athletic center, soccer field, fine arts facilities, and a notable horticulture facility and program.

Army JROTC
The school offers an Army Junior Reserve Officers' Training Corps program which emphasizes academics and physical fitness. Program participants compete in rifle and drill competitions.

School uniforms
Montgomery requires school uniforms. Ninth graders wear black shirts and upperclassmen wear white shirts. Students must wear khaki pants.

Notable alumni
Terry Adams, professional baseball player
Jimmy Sexton, professional baseball player
Ralph Staten, former professional NFL player

Notable faculty
Rusty Glover, Alabama State Senator

References

External links
Mary G. Montgomery High School
MGM Vikings Baseball

Public high schools in Alabama
Educational institutions established in 1965
High schools in Mobile County, Alabama
1965 establishments in Alabama